Cheyyar Division Highways Department (Construction & Maintenance) aims to develop and maintain the Highway network in the district and also ensures road safety and to cope with the future economic development of the state.

In Cheyyar Highways (C & M) Division, the total length of 1219.36 Kilometre of Government roads are maintained.

Classification 

The Classification of road are as follows

State Highways (SH) the total length of Kilometre is 221.014

Major District Roads (MDR) the total length of Kilometre is 210.750

Other District Roads (ODR) the total length of Kilometre is 787.600

State Highways

Major District Road

Other District Roads

See also 
 Highways of Tamil Nadu 
 Road Network in Tamil Nadu
 National Highways
 List of National Highways in India
 List of National Highways in India (by Highway Number)
 National Highways Authority of India

References 

Roads in Tamil Nadu
Tamil Nadu highways
Tamil Nadu-related lists